Mary Rose Gliksten  is a British Liberal Democrat politician. She was formerly Leader of the Royal Borough of Windsor and Maidenhead from 2003 to 2007, representing the Windsor (UK) Electoral Ward of Clewer East.

References 

Liberal Democrats (UK) councillors
Councillors in Berkshire
Living people
Year of birth missing (living people)
21st-century British politicians
21st-century British women politicians
Leaders of local authorities of England
Women councillors in England